Kampur Town (IPA: ˈkæmˌpʊə) is a census town in Nagaon district in the Indian state of Assam.

Geography

Kampur town can be reached from Nagaon, Assam District in two ways. It is 32 km from Nagaon District. It is located on the bank of the Kapili River.

Politics 
The Kampur Town city is divided into five wards for which elections are held every five years.

Demographics
 India census, Kampur Town Committee has a population of 10,371 of which 5,230 are males while 5,141 are females.

The population of children with age of 0-6 is 1035 which is 9.98% of the total. The female sex ratio is 983 against the state average of 958. Moreover, child sex ratio is around 917 compared to Assam state average of 962. The literacy rate is 88.28% higher than the state average of 72.19%. Male literacy is around 91.28% while the female literacy rate is 85.26%.

The town supplies over 2,342 houses with amenities including water and sewerage. It builds roads within town limits and taxes properties under its jurisdiction.

Religion 
The town includes people who are Hindu (84.9%), Muslim (14.2%), Christian (.5%), Sikh (.2%), Buddhist (0) Jain (.1%), other (0%), and not stated (.1%).

References

Cities and towns in Nagaon district